Ptychosperma elegans, commonly known as the solitaire palm (or elegant palm after the scientific name), is a very slender palm endemic to Queensland in Australia. In the nursery trade and in the United States it may be confusingly referred to as Alexander palm, which is an often-used but misnomered name of another Australian palm species Archontophoenix alexandrae, the Alexandra palm (note the difference in gender between the two names).

Description

Flowers are grouped in sets of 3, each with one pistillate (functionally female) and two staminate (functionally male) flowers.

Taxonomy and etymology

Originally described as Seaforthia elegans in 1810 by Robert Brown in his work Prodromus Florae Novae Hollandiae et Insulae Van Diemen, it was given its current binomial name in 1843 by Carl Ludwig Blume in his publication Rumphia, sive, Commentationes botanicæ imprimis de plantis Indiæ Orientalis.

The genus name Ptychosperma is derived from the Ancient Greek word ptukhḗ, meaning "a fold"; and spérma,  "seed". The species epithet elegans comes from the Latin term ēlegāns meaning "graceful" or "elegant".

Distribution and habitat
The species is endemic to Queensland, Australia, where it grows in both tropical and sub-tropical rainforests as an understory tree, often close to rivers and streams where there is plentiful water and good drainage.

Cultivation
The tropical species is a popular palm in gardens and parks, where its arched crown, slender trunk, and red fruit are regarded as appealing feature. They are less successful in cooler climates and somewhat to susceptible to frosts. Plants grown in pots or indoors require high amounts of light with humid and warm conditions. A blight that covers leaves with dark brown patches, especially in sub-tropical climates, does not seem to interfere with a specimen's growth.
Ptychosperma elegans is cultivated as an ornamental tree for planting in temperate climate gardens and parks.  It is a single trunked tree, that in cultivation can reach  in height.

It has been naturalized in South Florida since at least the 1950s, and remains the only member of its genus naturalized in the USA. Due to its intolerance of cold, it is mostly found in South Florida and coastal Tampa. It also is used in Coastal Southern California, primarily Orange and San Diego counties.

Gallery

See also
 Archontophoenix alexandrae — the similarly named Alexandra palm
 Adonidia — a palm genus with similar appearance

References

External links
 
 
  PACSOA—Palm and Cycad Societies of Australia wiki: Ptychosperma elegans (Solitaire palm) — with images
USDA Plants Profile for Ptychosperma elegans (Alexander palm)

elegans
Palms of Australia
Flora of Queensland
Flora of the Northern Territory
Endemic flora of Australia
Garden plants of Australia
Ornamental trees
Plants described in 1810
Taxa named by Robert Brown (botanist, born 1773)